Shudder is the fourth studio album by American rock band Bayside, released on September 30, 2008. Prior to its release, singer Anthony Raneri described the album as having a more alternative sound than their previous record, The Walking Wounded. The title comes from a lyric in the track "I Can’t Go On".

Background
In June 2008, the band recorded their next album at Red Bull Studios in Los Angeles, California.

Release
In July and August 2008, the band supported Alkaline Trio on their headlining US tour. On July 17, 2008, Shudder was announced for release in October.  On August 27, the album's track listing was revealed, followed by the artwork. In addition, it was mentioned that the album would be released slightly earlier, in September. On September 10, "No One Understands" was made available for streaming. On September 19, Shudder was made available for streaming through the group's Myspace profile, before being released on September 30 through independent label Victory Records. "You’ve Already Been" was added as an iTunes bonus track. In October and November, the band went on a headlining tour of the US with support from the Status, Valencia and the Matches. On October 15, a music video was released for "No One Understands". In December, the band co-headlined a tour of the UK with Hit the Lights. They were supported by Oh No Not Stereo. In January 2009, Raneri went on a solo tour alongside frontmen of the Get Up Kids, Saves the Day and Thrice. In February and March 2009, the band toured Australia as part of the Soundwave festival. Between late March and early May, the band supported New Found Glory on their headlining tour of the US. The band appeared at The Bamboozle festival in early May. Between late June and late August, the band performed on the Warped Tour. In October and November 2009, they supported the Bouncing Souls on their headlining US tour.

Track listing

Trivia
The intro and solo for the song “Roshambo (Rock, Paper, Scissors)” appears in a promo for Adult Swim’s anime hour.
“Have Fun Storming the Castle” is a quote from the movie The Princess Bride.
Shawn Harris, singer of pop punk band The Matches, did the artwork.

Personnel
Anthony Raneri – Vocals/Guitar
Jack O’Shea – Guitar
Nick Ghanbarian – Bass
Chris Guglielmo – Drums

References

External links

Shudder (bonus track version) at YouTube (streamed copy where licensed)

2008 albums
Bayside (band) albums
Victory Records albums
Albums produced by David Schiffman